Brandon Slagle is an American filmmaker and former actor, known for his films The Black Dahlia Haunting and House of Manson. In 2016 news of his film "Crossbreed" went viral when the casting of Vivica A. Fox' as the President of the United States was found to be the first time an African-American Woman had been cast as the President in a feature film.

In 2018 he directed The Dawn starring Stacey Dash, Jonathan Bennett, Teilor Grubbs, Devanny Pinn, and Ryan Kiser, which was released theatrically by Vertical Entertainment on January 10, 2020.

In 2019 he directed Attack of the Unknown starring Richard Grieco, Tara Reid, Robert LaSardo, Jolene Andersen, and Douglas Tait (actor). In 2021 he directed four feature films, Frost starring Devanny Pinn and Vernon Wells, Arena Wars starring Michael Madsen, Eric Roberts, Robert LaSardo, and John Wells, Breakout starring Louis Mandylor, Kristos Andrews, Brian Krause, and Tom Sizemore, and finally Battle of Saipan starring Casper Van Dien, Louis Mandylor, and Jeff Fahey.

Filmography

As director
 2005 The Dark Avengers
 2007 Subject 87
 2008 In the Land of Wicked Gods (short film)
 2009 Opiate (short film)
 2011 Cult Vol. 1 (segment "Opiate")
 2011 Wonderland
 2011 Area 51 Confidential
 2012 The Black Dahlia Haunting
 2014 Dead Sea
 2014 House of Manson
 2017 Escape from Ensenada (aka California Dreaming)
 2018 Crossbreed
 2019 The Dawn
 2020 Attack of the Unknown
 2022 Frost
 2022 Battle For Saipan
 2023 Arena Wars
 2023 Breakout
 2023 The Flood

As writer
 2023 3 Days in Malay
 2023 Operation Blood Hunt
 2023 The Midway Point
 2023 BloodVine

Selected acting filmography

Film
 2005 The Dark Avengers as Bryan Yuen Sage
 2006 Plasterhead as Henry
 2006 Disquiet as Brandon Dalisay
 2007 Polycarp as Dean Zimmer
 2007 Methodic as Detective Colin McDermott
 2010 15 till Midnight as Lukas Reyes
 2011 2012: Ice Age as The Major
 2012 The Black Dahlia Haunting as Malcolm
 2012 Argo as Canadian Embassy Staffer #1
 2012 Biohazard: Patient Zero as Dr. Jonathan Wright
 2012 Where the Dead Go to Die as Daddy
 2013 Entity as Damon
 2013 Dead Sea as Kier Than
 2014 House of Manson as Uncle Maddox
 2016 When Black Birds Fly as Caine
 2016 Daylight's End as 'Bunny'
 2020 JL Family Ranch 2 as Jeremy

Television
 2005 Sesame Street (1 episode) as Alphabet Town Resident

See also
Crystal Sky Pictures
Vivica A. Fox

References

External links
 

American film directors
American film producers
21st-century American male actors
Year of birth missing (living people)
Place of birth missing (living people)
Living people